Illfelder Importing Company (formerly Berolzheimer, Illfelder & Co.), was an American toy company, founded in 1856, that created toys like "Squirmles" and "Good Time Charlie".

Timeline 

1856: Leopold Illfelder and Daniel Berolzheimer founded the Vera-Bleistift-Fabrik pencil factory in Fürth, Bavaria, Germany.

 1858: Daniel Berolzheimer died, and was replaced by his son, Heinrich Berolzheimer. 

 1861: A US branch, Berolzheimer, Illfelder & Co. was created in New York City.
1860s-70s: Work with pencils, stationery, and importing at 60 John Street.
c.1870: Name shortened to B. Illfelder & Co.
1888: Death of Bernhard Illfelder.
1938: Move to 131 East 23rd st.

Notable People 

 Leopold Illfelder - Co-founded the original pencil company in 1856
 Daniel Berolzheimer - Co-founded the original pencil company in 1856
 Heinrich Berolzheimer (1836-1906) - Son of founder Daniel Berolzheimer, took over his father's role after his death.
 Bernhard Illfelder (1842-1888) - Came to the U.S. in 1864. Stepson of Leopold. Brother of Max. 
 Max Illfelder (1854-1943) - Brother of Bernhard.

Products 
Squirmles

Good Time Charlie

References

Toy companies of Germany
American companies established in 1856
Manufacturing companies established in 1856
Toy companies established in the 19th century
German companies established in 1856